Werdohl-Elverlingsen Power Station is a coal and gas fired power station in the state of North Rhine-Westphalia near Werdohl, Germany on the Lenne river; its water used for cooling.

Since 1912, this power station consumes natural gas and coal to produce it' electricity.  Its current owner and operator is Mark-E.

Coal-fired power stations in Germany
Buildings and structures in North Rhine-Westphalia